Jawker Dhan (The Treasure of Ghost) is a Bengali action adventure film of 2017 directed by Sayantan Ghosal. This movie was based on the adventure story of Bimal-Kumar duos of Hemendra Kumar Roy in the same name. In 1939, another Bengali film Jakher Dhan was made by director Haricharan Bhanja starring Ahindra Choudhury, Chhaya Devi and Jahar Ganguly. A sequel titled Sagardwipey Jawker Dhan was released in 2019. Addatimes streamed this on 15 April 2021 on the OTT platform.

Plot
Kumar discovers a puzzle engraved in a human skull. The skull was stored by his grandfather long ago. Unable to solve the puzzle, he consults his close friend Bimal to find out the secret behind it. Bimal is adventurous and also a professor of Anthropometry. They solve the puzzle and realise that this is nothing but a clue of a hidden Tibetan treasure which is concealed in an undisclosed spot in the dense jungles of Neora Valley. By this time, Bimal's elder brother, Hiranmoy, is kidnapped by an unknown group. Bimal and Kumar together start an adventure to recover the treasure and rescue Hiranmoy but Karali is also in a hunt for this treasure. Karali is ruthless and dares to capture the treasure at any cost.

Cast
 Parambrata Chatterjee as Bimal Sen
 Rahul Banerjee as Kumar Ray
 Sabyasachi Chakrabarty as Karali Mukhopadhyay 
 Priyanka Sarkar as Sharmistha Bose
 Kaushik Sen as Hiranmoy Bose
 Samidh Mukherjee as Shombhu Gomphu
 Arindol Bagchi

Soundtrack

References

External links
 

Bengali-language Indian films
2010s Bengali-language films
2017 films
2010s action adventure films
Indian action adventure films
Treasure hunt films
Films based on Indian novels
Films directed by Sayantan Ghosal